San Lorenzo Ruiz, officially the Municipality of San Lorenzo Ruiz, is a 5th class municipality in the province of Camarines Norte, Philippines. According to the 2020 census, it has a population of 15,757 people.

It was established as the Municipality of Imelda in 1970, through R.A. 6144, constituting the barrios Daculangbolo, Laniton, Langga, Maisog, Dagotdotan, Mampurog, Matacong, in the Municipality of Daet, and San Isidro, San Antonio, San Ramon, Manlimonsito, Salvacion in the Municipality of Basud.

Imelda was renamed on February 10, 1989, in honor of San Lorenzo Ruiz, the first Filipino saint venerated in the Roman Catholic Church, canonized on October 18, 1987.

Geography

Barangays
San Lorenzo Ruiz is politically subdivided into 12 barangays.
 Daculang Bolo
 Dagotdotan
 Langga
 Laniton
 Maisog
 Mampurog
 Manlimonsito
 Matacong (Poblacion)
 Salvacion
 San Antonio
 San Isidro
 San Ramon

Climate

Demographics

Economy

Tourism
Waterfalls
 Nacali Falls - Barangay Maisog
 Nakawa Falls - Barangay Maisog
 Angelina Falls - San Isidro
 Nabangko Falls - Barangay San Isidro
 Ibatan Falls - Barangay San Isidro
Matacong Zipline

It is the longest zipline in the whole Bicol region located in Barangay Matacong. The zipline is 750 meters long and is managed by the Local Government Unit (LGU) of San Lorenzo Ruiz. San Lorenzo Ruiz is aiming to become an Eco-Adventure town and the zipline is the start of their plans to add more facilities in the area to increase adventure sports like rappelling, water tubing, trekking, all terrain vehicle ride and many more.

Canyoning and River Trekking

The Mampurog River have several meters of canyons and deep part of river that is suitable for canyoning activities. Canyoning is frequently done in remote and rugged settings and often requires navigational, route-finding and other wilderness travel skills.

On April 9, 2017, five explorers from Camarines Norte was given a permit by Nelson P. Delos Santos (Municipal Mayor) and Mr. Manuel Racho (Municipal Tourism Officer) to explore the Nacali Falls river and mampurog river as part of their dream to create a comprehensive list of waterfalls and different natural attractions in the province.  One member of the team, Mr. Benjie S. Ilagan is a resident of Barangay Mampurog and has visited Nacali Falls for more than five times. The other members of the team are as follows: Mr. Kimber Kaye S. Reyes as the team leader and navigator; Mr. Chris A. Camus the scribe; Mr. Gilbert Parale the timer and Mr. Jossiah Nathaniel M. Parena, aspiring to become a mountaineer and the youngest member of the group. 
A preliminary exploration was conducted prior to the actual exploration for the preparation and planning of the team.  The team was surprised to see several meters of canyons and deep part of river that is suitable for canyoning Activities. The waterfalls can also be used for rappelling activities. The team also saw different waterfalls created by the big boulders present in the river.
After six hours of river trekking and canyoning from the Nacali Falls river junction, the team found out that due to the limited time of the exploration, Mampurog river was not reached. Thus, the team recommends to the municipal Mayor and the tourism officer to allow them to explore the place in the future.

Flora 
The recent discovery of a R. manillana haven in Mt. Guinatungan, a lesser-known mountain in Camarines Norte, Philippines, not only provided additional locality of distribution, but also resulted to better understanding of the taxonomic complexity of the Rafflesia species. While available literatures cite Rafflesia as critically endangered, it seems otherwise in Camarines Norte. A recent Rafflesia expedition showed significant populations of this species. This situation calls for a multi-agency approach in management and actions integrating research and development that are focused on the conservation and protection not only of the species but more importantly its host and habitat.

Mr. George De Mesa Cordovilla, one of the participants in the “Tukad Bicol, Tukad Labo” Bantayog Festival climb organized by the Oryol Outdoor Group Inc. on April 15, 2016, was able to take a snapshot of the rafflesia flower. Mr. Cordovilla is from Albay and is known as the expert climber of Mayon.

References

External links
 [ Philippine Standard Geographic Code]
Philippine Census Information

Municipalities of Camarines Norte